John Francis "Jon" Cassar (born 27 April 1958) is a Maltese-Canadian television director and producer, known for his work on the first seven seasons of 24. In 2006, he won the Primetime Emmy Award for Outstanding Directing for a Drama Series for his work on the episode "Day 5: 7:00 a.m. – 8:00 a.m.". In 2011, he produced and directed all episodes of the Canadian-American miniseries The Kennedys, for which he won the Directors Guild of America Award for Outstanding Directing – Television Film and was nominated for the Primetime Emmy Award for Outstanding Miniseries or Movie.

Early life
Jon Francis Cassar was born in Malta on 27 April 1958, and immigrated to Canada in 1963 with his mother, Elda (née Segona), and father, Frank Cassar. He has two younger siblings, Bernard Cassar and Kristine Palsis. Cassar is a graduate of Algonquin College in Ottawa, Ontario.

Career
After La Femme Nikita ended, for which he directed 14 episodes, Cassar began working as director and executive producer on the FOX drama-thriller series 24. In 2006, he won the Primetime Emmy Award for Outstanding Directing for a Drama Series for the episode "Day 5: 7:00 a.m. – 8:00 a.m.". In addition, he was nominated for the Primetime Emmy Award for Outstanding Drama Series four years in a row (2003–06), winning one in 2006. He directed the spin-off feature film, 24: Redemption, in 2008. Following the completion of the seventh season of 24, Cassar left the series to focus on other projects. He joined the FOX science fiction series Terra Nova in 2010, as a producer and director.

In 2012, Cassar won the Directors Guild of America Award for Outstanding Directing – Television Film and the Directors Guild of Canada Award for Outstanding Direction – Television Movie/Miniseries for his work on the 2011 miniseries The Kennedys. For producing the series, he was also nominated for the Primetime Emmy Award for Outstanding Miniseries or Movie. In 2014, it was announced that he would return for 24 follow-up event series, 24: Live Another Day, which debuted on May 5, 2014. In 2015, Cassar joined the ABC anthology series Wicked City as an executive producer and director.

Personal life
Cassar is married to Kristina Kinderman with whom he has two children: photographer Zak Cassar and actor Alexis "Lex" Cassar. Zak is married to singer Betty Who and Lex's  wife is actress Sprague Grayden.

He is the co-founder of the Motion Picture Industry Charitable Alliance, which hosts an annual charity auction called "Lights, Camera, Auction".

Filmography

Director credits

Television

 FBI: Most Wanted (2023; 1 episode)
 FBI (2022; 1 episode)
 Medici: Masters of Florence (2018; first four episodes of the second season)
 The Orville (2017-2019; 3 episodes)
 24: Legacy (2017; 4 episodes)
 The Kennedys: After Camelot (2017; 3 episodes)
 Wicked City (2015; 8 episodes)
 Between (2015; 2 episodes)
 24: Live Another Day (2014; 6 episodes)
 Nikita (2013; episode: "Reunion")
 Revolution (2012–2013; 2 episodes)
 Person of Interest (2012; episode: "Bad Code")
 Continuum (2012; 2 episodes)
 Touch (2012; episode: "Tessellations")
 Terra Nova (2011; 5 episodes)
 The Kennedys (2011; 8 episodes)
 Human Target (2010; episode: "Lockdown")
 Fringe (2009–2012; 2 episodes)
 Washington Field (2009; unsold pilot)
 Criminal Minds (2009; episode: "Haunted")
 Company Man (2007; unsold pilot)
 24 (2001–2009; 59 episodes)
 The Dead Zone (2002; 2 episodes)
 Mutant X (2001–2002; 3 episodes)
 Sheena (2000–2001; 3 episodes)
 Queen of Swords (2000; 2 episodes)
 Code Name: Eternity (2000; episode: "Death Trap")
 Psi Factor: Chronicles of the Paranormal (2000; episode: "GeoCore")
 Profiler (1999; 2 episodes)
 Amazon (1999; episode: "Fallen Angels")
 La Femme Nikita (1997–2001; 14 episodes)
 F/X: The Series (1997; episode: "Medea")
 Baywatch Nights (1996–1997; 4 episodes)
 Due South (1996; episode: "Body Language")
 The Hardy Boys (1995; 2 episodes)
 Pointman (1995; 5 episodes)
 Nancy Drew (1995; 4 episodes)
 Kung Fu: The Legend Continues (1994–1996; 12 episodes)
 Forever Knight (1992–1996; 7 episodes)

Film

 When the Bough Breaks (2016)
 Forsaken (2015)
 24: Redemption (2008)
 Danger Beneath the Sea (2001)
 Assault on Death Mountain (1999)
 CHiPs '99 (1998)
 The Ultimate Weapon (1998)
 Assault on Devil's Island (1997)
 The Final Goal Part 2: Final Goalier (1996)
 The Final Goal (1995)

Producer credits 

 The Orville (2019–present; 14 episodes; Executive producer from Season 2)
 24: Legacy (2017; 12 episodes)
 The Kennedys: After Camelot (2017; 4 episodes)
 Wicked City (2015; 8 episodes)
 Rio Heat (2015)
 24: Live Another Day (2014; 12 episodes)
 Terra Nova (2011; 13 episodes)
 The Kennedys (2011; 8 episodes)
 24: Redemption (2008)
 24: Day 6 Debrief (2007; 5 episodes)
 24 (2002–09; 147 episodes)

Camera credits 

 PCU (1994; camera operator)
 Trapped in Paradise (1994; camera operator)
 Clearcut (1992; Steadicam and camera operator)
 The Cutting Edge (1992; camera operator)
 Termini Station (1991; camera operator)
 Millennium (1989; Steadicam operator)
 The Dream Team (1989; Steadicam operator)

Awards and nominations

References

External links
 
 2007 Audio Interview at Your Video Store Shelf

1958 births
Living people
Canadian television directors
Canadian television producers
Algonquin College alumni
Primetime Emmy Award winners
Directors Guild of America Award winners
Maltese emigrants to Canada
Maltese television directors
Maltese television producers